Runner Duck is a video game developer headquartered in the UK. It was founded by Dave Miller and Jon Wingrove in 2016.

History 
Runner Duck was founded in December 2016 as an independent games development studio by former AAA, casual and mobile game developers Dave Miller and Jon Wingrove. The founders had previously worked on popular games such as Race Driver: Grid, Colin McRae: DiRT 2, and the Buzz! series.

Runner Duck released their first game, Bomber Crew in October 2017, published by Curve Games.

In 2018, Runner Duck won the MCV/Develop Award for "Best New Studio".

In March 2019, Curve Games parent company Catalis Group acquired Runner Duck with the aim of continuing the "crew" franchise with Curve Games as the publisher.

Games developed

References 

Video game companies established in 2016
Video game companies of the United Kingdom
Video game development companies